Lakhala is a village of Abbottabad District in Khyber Pakhtunkhwa, Pakistan. Its thana is Sherwan and Tehsil Lower Tanawaland district Abbottabad.

References

Populated places in Abbottabad District